The Seal of Palau depicts a traditional meeting center. The executive seal, used by overseas missions and by the nation's president, is also of a similar design.

The seal also resembles the seal of the Trust Territory of the Pacific Islands, the governing body which formerly controlled Palau.

Historical Armorial

References

National symbols of Palau
Palau
Palau
Palau